Pant Halt railway station served the hamlet of Pant-pastynog, Denbighshire, Wales, from 1905 to 1915 on the Pontcysyllte branch.

History 
The station was opened on 1 May 1905 by the Great Western Railway when they introduced railmotor services from Wrexham General station as far as Wynn Hall Halt. It was situated on the south side of the B5097. It had no station buildings or any other facilities but nearby was The Pant Brickworks, which was served by rail. The station closed on 22 March 1915 after losing to the competition of the newly introduced bus services. The Pontcysyllte branch remained in use for goods traffic until 1953, and after that the line to the south of Pant was closed and lifted, but the section of the line from Pant nothwards remained open to serve the brick works. The station's final use was a rail tour on 18 April 1959. The section of the line finally closed on 14 October 1963, and the line was lifted in 1964.

References 

Disused railway stations in Denbighshire
Former Great Western Railway stations
Railway stations in Great Britain opened in 1905
Railway stations in Great Britain closed in 1915
1905 establishments in Wales
1915 disestablishments in Wales